Frank Talmadge "Dixie" Davis (October 12, 1890 – February 4, 1944) was a professional baseball player who played for parts of 10 seasons as a pitcher in the Major leagues.

External links

1890 births
1944 deaths
People from Johnston County, North Carolina
Major League Baseball pitchers
Baseball players from North Carolina
Cincinnati Reds players
Chicago White Sox players
Philadelphia Phillies players
St. Louis Browns players
Knoxville Appalachians players
Columbus Senators players
Knoxville Reds players
Louisville Colonels (minor league) players
Kansas City Blues (baseball) players
Chattanooga Lookouts players
Winston-Salem Twins players
Atlanta Crackers players